Due to the cession of North Carolina's trans-Appalachian territory to form the Southwest Territory, the territory of the old  was lost.  North Carolina retained the same number of Representatives, and so it redistricted for the Second Congress.

See also 
 United States House of Representatives elections, 1790 and 1791
 List of United States representatives from North Carolina

References 

North Carolina
1791
United States House of Representatives